Sir Syed University of Engineering and Technology (known as "SSUET") is a private research university located in the urban area of Karachi, Sindh, Pakistan.  The university is honored in the name of notable 19th-century Indian Muslim reformer and philosopher, Sir Syed Ahmad Khan.

Overview 
Sir Syed University of Engineering and Technology was founded by the late chancellor, Z.A. Nizami. Nizami is the former director general of the Karachi Development Authority (KDA) as well as the president of Aligarh Muslim University Old Boys Association. The university is noted for its strong emphasis on the development on history, philosophy, modern science and engineering. The outstanding real time projects of the university refers Pakistan the technologically sound, on the face of earth. The university offers academic programmes for undergraduate, post-graduate, and doctoral studies in science and engineering. 

The university holds a unique reputation for conducting and engaging research in science, energy, and engineering to meet its international standards. Furthermore, the university's admission policy also won praise from the public circles for offering world-class science programmes to the students despite their insufficient number of examination seats required for the admission in the engineering universities of the country. Sir Syed University of Engineering and Technology is the only University that offers scholarships to every student who perform well in any semester with a Scholarship grant of 48–54%, which enable many students to perform well continuously in their curriculum years.

History
Sir Syed University of Engineering and Technology is based on the heritage of Sir Syed Ahmed Khan and of the Aligarh Movement. An education and social reformer, Sir Syed emerged on the scene in the sub-continent towards the middle of the 19th century. In the spirit of the Aligarh Movement, AMUOBA (Aligarh Muslim University Old Boys Association) focused attention on furthering education in Pakistan, especially science and technology. An achievement in this field has been the establishment of Sir Syed University of Engineering and Technology (SSUET). SSUET came into being on 8 October 1993, and its Charter formalities were completed by an Act passed by the Sindh Assembly on 17 September 1995.
The founder of this University is Z.A. Nizami.

Affiliated institution 
 Aligarh Institute of Technology (AIT)

Academic profile

SSUET provides degrees in 11 disciplines.

Undergraduate program
The university offer undergraduate programs in various disciplines for BS and BSc, leading to a bachelor's degree.

Faculty of Electrical and Computer Engineering (FOECE) 

 BS in Biomedical Engineering
 BS in Biomedical Sciences
 BS in Biotechnology
 BS in Computer Engineering
 BS in Electrical Engineering
 BS in Electronic Engineering
 BS in Telecommunication Engineering
 BS in Mobile Communication and Security
 BSc in Electrical Engineering Technology
 BSc in Electronic Engineering Technology

Faculty of Computing and Applied sciences (FOCAS) 

 BS in Bioinformatics
 BS in Computer Science
 BS in Information Technology
 BS in Software Engineering
 BS in Mathematics

Faculty of Civil Engineering and Architecture (FOCVA) 

 Bachelor of Architecture
 BS in Civil Engineering
 BSc in Civil Engineering Technology

Faculty of Business, Management and Social sciences (FOBMS) 

 Bachelor of Business Administration
 BS in Business Administration (2.5 Years Program, For 14 Years Degree Holders only)

Master's program

Faculty of Electrical and Computer Engineering (FOECE) 

 MS Biomedical Engineering
 MS Computer Engineering
 MS in Electrical Engineering
 MS in Electronic Engineering
 MS Telecommunication Engineering

Faculty of Computing and Applied sciences (FOCAS) 

 MS Computer Science
 MS in Software Engineering
 MS Mathematics

Faculty of Civil Engineering and Architecture (FOCVA) 

 MS Civil Engineering

Faculty of Business, Management and Social sciences (FOBMS) 

 Master of Business administration

Doctoral degree

 PhD Biomedical Engineering
 PhD Computer Engineering
 PhD in Electronic Engineering

SSUET has an Institute of Human Settlement and Environment specializing in Environmental Management Science.

Recognized university
Higher Education Commission of Pakistan (HEC) places Sir Syed university at No. 12 in its rankings in the engineering category.

It is one of the leading universities in Karachi and is listed among the country's top universities in "engineering and technology" category by the Higher Education Commission of Pakistan, as of 2013.  In addition, the university is also a member of the Association of Commonwealth Universities of the United Kingdom as well as the member of the International Association of Universities.

Associations
International Association of Universities
Pakistan Engineering Council
Higher Education Commission of Pakistan
Association of Commonwealth Universities

Student affairs

Online Classes
Sir Syed University of Engineering & Technology starts online classes in 2020.

Sport
The university has a sports ground in front of its main gate. This includes a basketball court, volleyball ground and cricket pitch for net practice. Steps for developing hockey and football grounds are in progress. A room contains equipment for health activities and body building.

Indoor games available are table tennis and badminton.

Outdoor games available are cricket, athletic track, soccer field, hockey, basketball and volleyball.

Ahmad Ali Rafi Ahmad S/O Major (R) Rafi uddin Ahmad was one of the brilliant athlete that Sir Syed University has produced. He has many national and international awards under his belt and was named the best sports man of the period from 2004 - 2008.

Music
The university has always promoted extra curricular activities and Musical events are arranged yearly in which opportunities are given to the students who are good in Singing and Music.

Syed Muhammad Umer S/O Major Syed Basith is one of the prominent names in Pakistan's Music Industry who has graduated from Sir Syed University of Engineering and Technology and throughout his tenure in University he was famous for his Musical/Guitars and Singing Skills. Imran Butt, the vocalist of F&I has also graduated from this university as electronic engineer.

Student Societies
Sir Syed university of engineering & technology has a Literary Art & Cultural forum (SSULACF) formerly known as Brig. Qamarussalam Forum. In this forum extra curricular activities are to be carried out. e.g. debates, Qira'at, Naat, Speeches, Quizzes Musical events & other positive creative activities

IEEE SSUET Student Branch 
Institute of Electrical and Electronics Engineers (IEEE) recently opened its student branch in Sir Syed University of Engineering and Technology. The IEEE SSUET Student Branch is responsible for organizing IEEE related seminars along with other technical and non-technical workshops in the university. According to their website, the goal of IEEE SSUET Student Branch is to bring students closer to the latest development that is being made in the field of science and technology and to groom students to be motivated and bring out the best in them to help reshaping the future. IEEE SSUET Student Branch consists of five sub-branches: IEEE SSUET Computer Society, IEEE SSUET EMB Society, IEEE Power and Energy Society, IEEE Robotics and Automation Society, and the recently inaugurated IEEE Women in Engineering Society.

Career planning and placement 
The Career Planning and Placement Bureau is aimed at establishing liaison between the engineers/graduates and employers, and provides internships go-ahead forms only to organizations. The objective is to have a department that sets a platform to provide job opportunities for students and employees for the firms, so far the resources at disposable are rudimentary and great amount of efforts and dedication is needed to fulfill its responsibilities which should include :

 Counseling and guidance 
 Career planning of students 
 Placement services 
 Arrangements for visits of delegates/prospective employers 
 Projects collaboration 
 Research collaboration 
 Higher education of counseling 
 Collaboration with professional bodies 
 Industrial tours 
 and workshops 
 Exhibitions 
 Internship
 Higher education of counseling

Festivals and Events

Academic events 

 SSUET Job fair 
 Flyover dedication 
 Foundation stone laying ceremony 
 International Forum For Researchers
 2nd International student convention Lahore

Sports events 

 Seminar: State of sports in Pakistan 
 NED Inter University cricket tournament, 2016 
 Jashn-e-Azadi cricket tournament 
 Ceremony of Astro Truff 
 Sports Gala 2018
 HEC zone G Hockey championship 2018-19
 HEC zone G Interuniversity volley ball championship, 2018-19
 Pakistan day tug of war championship

Miscellaneous events 

 SSUET new campus' tree plantation drive at education city
 Global Women Entrepreneur
 Forum on Pakistani and European Construction Industry
 Aligarh Muslim University Old Boys’ Association held AGM

Future campus
The second campus of SSUET (200 acres) is planned to be developed in Education City, Karachi. The development of the campus has been delayed and currently in progress.

Notable alumni
Sajid Ahmed, Member of National Assembly of Pakistan and leader of Muttahida Qaumi Movement – Pakistan
Abdul Haseem Khan International Hockey Player, (Pakistan Hockey Federation)

References

External links
SSUET official site

Engineering universities and colleges in Pakistan
Universities and colleges in Karachi
Educational institutions established in 1993
Private universities and colleges in Sindh
1993 establishments in Pakistan